The 1943–44 Idaho Vandals men's basketball team represented the University of Idaho during the 1943–44 NCAA college basketball season. Members of the Pacific Coast Conference, the Vandals were led by second-year acting head coach James "Babe" Brown and played their home games on campus at Memorial Gymnasium in Moscow, Idaho.

In Idaho's final game of the season, they handed visiting Washington their only conference loss. Idaho swept the four games with Palouse rival Washington State, but dropped all eight to the two Oregon schools.

References

External links
Sports Reference – Idaho Vandals: 1943–44 basketball season
Gem of the Mountains: 1944 University of Idaho yearbook – 1943–44 basketball season
Idaho Argonaut – student newspaper – 1944 editions

Idaho Vandals men's basketball seasons
Idaho
Idaho
Idaho